Gehyra fehlmanni, also known commonly as Fehlmann's dtella or Fehlmann's four-clawed gecko, is a species of lizard in the family Gekkonidae. The species is native to Southeast Asia.

Etymology
The specific name, fehlmanni, is in honor of American ichthyologist Hermann Adair Fehlmann.

Geographic range
G. fehlmanni is found in Thailand and Vietnam.

Habitat
The preferred natural habitats of G. fehlmanni are forest and rocky areas.

Description

Behavior
G. fehlmanni is terrestrial and nocturnal.

Reproduction
G. fehlmanni is oviparous.

References

Further reading
Bobrov VV; Semenov DV (2008). [Lizards of Vietnam ]. Moscow: [KMK Scientific Press]. 236 pp. (in Russian).
Chan-ard T, Parr JWK, Nabhitabhata J (2015). A Field Guide to the Reptiles of Thailand. New York: Oxford University Press. 352 pp.  (hardcover),  (paperback).
Manthey U, Grossmann W (1997). Amphibien und Reptilien Südostasiens. Münster: Natur und Tier Verlag. 512 pp. . (Gehyra fehlmanni, p. 229). (in German).
Taylor EH (1962). "New Oriental Reptiles". University of Kansas Science Bulletin 43: 209–263. (Peropus fehlmanni, new species, pp. 221–224, Figure 5).

Gehyra
Reptiles of Cambodia
Geckos of Thailand
Geckos of Vietnam
Reptiles described in 1962
Taxa named by Edward Harrison Taylor